Aren't You Glad? is the third release by American punk rock band The White Noise, and the first under their moniker The White Noise. The EP was released on February 26, 2016, under Fearless Records.

Music
With Aren't You Glad, the White Noise blends elements of post-hardcore, melodic hardcore, hardcore punk and punk rock.

Track listing

Personnel
The White Noise
Shawn Walker – Unclean vocals
David Southern – Clean vocals, rhythm guitar
Josh "KJ" Strock – Lead guitar
Bailey Crego – Bass
Tommy West – Drums

Production
Brad Blackwood - Mastering
Drew Fulk - Mixing, producing

References 

2016 EPs
Post-hardcore EPs
Hardcore punk EPs
Fearless Records EPs
The White Noise albums